Vivus Wright Dorwin (January 15, 1832September 27, 1904) was an American farmer, businessman, Republican politician, and Wisconsin pioneer.  He served four terms in the Wisconsin State Assembly, representing Pepin County.

Biography
Dorwin was born on January 15, 1832, in Champion, New York. He later lived in Jackson, Adams County, Wisconsin, for a time before settling in Durand, Wisconsin, in 1856. In Durand, Dorwin owned a gristmill, wool carding mill, dairy farm and two cheese factories. During the American Civil War, he was a captain with the 25th Wisconsin Infantry Regiment of the Union Army. Events he took part in include the Siege of Vicksburg.

Dorwin and his wife, Helen, would have eleven children. Among them was Marcellus Dorwin, who also became a member of the Assembly. The elder Dorwin died on September 27, 1904.

Political career
Dorwin was elected to the Assembly in 1876, 1877, 1884 and 1888. Other positions he held include Chairman of the Town Board of Supervisors of Durand. He was a Republican.

References

External links
The Strangest Names In American Political History

People from Champion, New York
People from Adams County, Wisconsin
People from Durand, Wisconsin
Mayors of places in Wisconsin
Republican Party members of the Wisconsin State Assembly
People of Wisconsin in the American Civil War
Union Army officers
Farmers from Wisconsin
Dairy farmers
Millers
1832 births
1904 deaths
Burials in Wisconsin
19th-century American politicians